Faletau is a Tongan surname. Notable people with the surname include:

Kuli Faletau (born 1963), Tongan rugby union player 
Sione Faletau (born 1988), Tongan rugby union player
Taulupe Faletau (born 1990), Tongan-born Welsh rugby union player, son of Kuli
Lanu Hahau Faletau (born 1992), member of the Tongan royal family 

Tongan-language surnames